Giulio Taccon (born November 6, 2002) is an Italian-Chinese musician and actor, born in the city of Taiyuan, Shanxi province, Northern China. He started learning piano in Italy at the age of 6.

Giulio Taccon played Brandon Lee in the 50th episode of the TV series The Legend of Bruce Lee, which was aired on and produced by CCTV in 2006. Giulio was born from an Italian father and Chinese mother.

References

External links
 Giulio Taccon Official Website
 Youtube

Living people
2002 births
Chinese pianists
Italian people of Chinese descent
Chinese people of Italian descent
People from Taiyuan
People's Republic of China musicians
Musicians from Shanxi
Male actors from Shanxi
Chinese male television actors
Chinese male child actors
21st-century pianists